Truong Tri Truc Diem (Vietnamese name: Trương Tri Trúc Diễm) (born May 24 in Ho Chi Minh City) is a super model, actress, goodwill ambassador of UNESCO (2010) and Vietnamese beauty pageant titleholder who was first runner-up of Miss Vietnam Photogenic 2005 pageant. She graduated from PSB Academy of Singapore with a  Business Administration degree. In 2006, she became face and spokesperson for many international brands and products in Vietnam and Asia, giving a pump up for her model career as she was chosen most young and successful model of 2006. Truc Diem speaks Vietnamese, English, Korean and is studying Chinese. In 2007 she entered Miss Earth and won the title Miss Fashion, also in same year Global beauties voted her top 50 most beautiful women on earth. She also entered Top 15 semi-finalist in Miss International 2011 in China.

Diem was chosen as leading actress in movie Snow White Diary in 2010. This movie wasn't a big hit as it suppose but Diem acting talent has been recognized as potential,  so Diem decided to take acting class more serious for her better career in acting. In 2012 Diem came back strong as she is lead actress of new movie Passion, produced by phim truyen 1, a member of Government film production. Passion has been showing at Vietnam International Film Festival, Golden Lotus Film Festival, Asian Film festival in Malaysia ( AIFFA). After the succeed of Passion movie, Diem continued to show her potential by getting the Role Ha My in How to fight in six-inch heels of director Ham Tran in 2013, the movie has become a hit, a block buster and a must see movie, has been making it way not only in Vietnam but to Australia and America as well. During 2013, Diem also making it big as being chosen to represent Vietnam actress at Cannes film festival, Diem said it was a " dream come true " to her.

She married with John Từ, an American-Vietnamese in 2015 and announced her divorced in 2021. The official announcement was announced on her personal Facebook in December 28.

Miss Earth 2007 
She was considered a potential contender to win the crown of Miss Earth 2007 which took place in Philippines, but she failed to make the cut in final night. She won the Miss Fashion award when the competition was taken place in Vietnam - the co-host of Miss Earth 2007. According to Global Beauties, Truc Diem was one of top fifty most beautiful women in the world and one of top ten non-finalists in 2007 and 2008.

Miss International 2011 
She was a potential contender for the crown of Miss International 2011, but was only placed in Top 15 and did not win any special awards.

References

1987 births
Miss Earth 2007 contestants
Living people
Vietnamese beauty pageant winners
Miss International 2011 delegates